Wellington College may refer to:

Wellington College, Berkshire, an independent school in Crowthorne, Berkshire, England
 Wellington College International Shanghai
 Wellington College International Tianjin
Wellington College, Wellington, New Zealand
Wellington College Belfast, a grammar school in Belfast, Northern Ireland
Wellington College, Hong Kong in Kowloon Bay, Hong Kong
Wellington Girls' College, Wellington, New Zealand
Wellington College, fictional liberal arts college and setting of Zadie Smith's 2005 novel On Beauty

See also
Wellington School (disambiguation)